Alyn Richard Beals (April 27, 1921 – August 11, 1993) was a professional American football end/defensive end in the All-America Football Conference (AAFC) and the National Football League (NFL). He played six seasons for the San Francisco 49ers from 1946 through 1951.

Early life
Beals grew up in San Francisco, California and was raised by his mother, who divorced his father when Beals was three years old. He excelled at San Francisco Polytechnic High School in football (right near Kezar Stadium, which led to a scholarship from Santa Clara University after he picked them over the University of California. Beals was drafted by the Chicago Bears in 1942, but Beals elected to serve in World War II, where he later became a Field Artillery Battery Commander. Beals scored 46 touchdowns in four seasons with the team (1939 to 1943) and he was inducted into the university's Hall of Fame in 1964.

Football career
Beals was given a letter by the Chicago Bears to gauge his interest in playing for them in his senior season in 1942, but he served in World War II instead. He did ROTC at Santa Clara, and later served as a Field Artillery Battery Commander, seeing action at Battle of the Bulge and also serving as security during the Nuremberg trials.

When the war ended, he was recruited to play for the newly formed San Francisco 49ers of the All-America Football Conference (AAFC) and play for Buck Shaw, his former coach at Santa Clara, bolstered by a $4,500 contract that dwarfed his $275 a month when in the Army. Beals led the AAFC in receiving touchdowns all four years of the league's existence and in 1949 he was the AAFC leader in overall touchdowns (12) and points scored (73). His 14 receiving touchdowns in 1948 was a club record for nearly four decades. When the AAFC folded at the end of the 1949 season, he was the league's all-time scoring leader with 278 points.

When Beals retired with 49 touchdowns as a receiver, he was 3rd all-time in pro football history. His 211 receptions were sixth all-time at the time of retirement.

References

External links

1921 births
1993 deaths
People from Marysville, California
Players of American football from California
American football wide receivers
San Francisco 49ers (AAFC) players
San Francisco 49ers players
Santa Clara Broncos football players
Sportspeople from Greater Sacramento